was a historian in Meiji and Taishō period Japan.  He had a son, Kume Keiichirō, who was a noted painter.

Biography
Kume was born in Saga Domain, Hizen (present-day Saga Prefecture), and was active in attempting to assist the administrative reform of Saga domain during the Bakumatsu period.

After the Meiji Restoration, he was selected to join the Iwakura mission on its around-the-world voyage in 1871–73 as the private secretary to Iwakura Tomomi. In 1878 he published the Tokumei Zenken Taishi Bei-O Kairan Jikki ( 「特命全権大使米欧回覧実記」), a five-volume account of the journey, and of what he observed of the United States and Europe.

Kume became a professor at Tokyo Imperial University in 1888, while contributing to Dai Nihon Hennenshi, an encyclopedic comprehensive history of Japan.

In 1889, he was awarded the Order of the Sacred Treasure.

However, in 1892, he was forced to resign after publishing a paper Shinto wa saiten no kozoku ( 「神道は祭天の古俗」 ) ("Shinto is an outmoded custom deifying nature"), which the government considered to be seditious and highly critical of the State Shinto system.

Kume continued to write and lecture at the Tokyo Semmon Gakko  ( 東京専門学校), the predecessor of Waseda University, after his resignation from Tokyo University.

Works 
Tokumei Zenken Taishi Bei-O Kairan Jikki (「特命全権大使米欧回覧実記」), Tokyo, 1878

Available in English

 Kume Kunitake. Healey, Graham and Tsuzuki Chushichi, eds. The Iwakura embassy, 1871-73 : a true account of the ambassador extraordinary & plenipotentiary's journey of observation through the United States of America and Europe  (The Japan Documents, 2002)

Notes

References
 Brownlee, John S. (1997) Japanese historians and the national myths, 1600–1945: The Age of the Gods and Emperor Jimmu. Vancouver: University of British Columbia Press.   Tokyo: University of Tokyo Press. 
 Nish, Ian. (1998) The Iwakura Mission to America and Europe: A New Assessment. Richmond, Surrey: Japan Library. 	; ;  OCLC 40410662

External links
 Link to Kume Museum of Art (in Japanese)

1839 births
1931 deaths
People from Saga Prefecture
Kokugaku scholars
Japanese_atheists
Meiji Restoration
20th-century Japanese historians
People of Meiji-period Japan
Nabeshima retainers
Members of the Iwakura Mission
19th-century Japanese historians